Marvin V. Rush A.S.C. is a director of photography, cinematographer, television director and a camera operator. He is perhaps best known for his work on the Star Trek franchise.

He was nominated twice for an Emmy Award in his cinematography work: in 1991 for the Star Trek:The Next Generation episode "Family" and in 1995 for the Star Trek: Voyager episode "Heroes and Demons".

Cinematographer
 Easy Street (1986-1987)
 Meet the Hollowheads (1989)
 Star Trek: The Next Generation (director of photography) (as Marvin Rush) (1993-1994)
 Star Trek: Deep Space Nine (1993–94)
 Star Trek: Voyager (1995-2001)
 Star Trek: Borg (1996)
 Archibald the Rainbow Painter (1998)
 Star Trek: Enterprise (2001-2005}
 E-Ring (2006)
 Hell on Wheels (2011-2016)

Director
 Star Trek: The Next Generation
 The Host
 Star Trek: Voyager
 Favorite Son
 The Thaw 
 Star Trek: Enterprise
 In a Mirror, Darkly, Part II
 Terra Prime

Namesake
 Rush dilithium crystals were named after him

References

External links
 

1953 births
Living people
American cinematographers
American television directors